Sephina is a genus of leaf-footed bugs in the family Coreidae. There are more than 20 described species in Sephina.

Species
These 24 species belong to the genus Sephina:

 Sephina ayalai Brailovsky, 1983
 Sephina bicornis Distant, 1881
 Sephina dorsalis (White, 1842)
 Sephina erythromelas (White, 1842)
 Sephina esquivalae Brailovsky & Sánchez, 1983
 Sephina excellens Schmidt, 1907
 Sephina faceta Brailovsky, 2001
 Sephina formosa (Dallas, 1852)
 Sephina geniculata Distant, 1881
 Sephina gundlachii Guérin-Méneville, 1857 (giant milkweed bug)
 Sephina indierae Wolcott, 1924
 Sephina limbata Stål, 1862
 Sephina maculata (Dallas, 1852)
 Sephina miniacea (Blanchard, 1846)
 Sephina nigripes Schmidt, 1907
 Sephina pagella Brailovsky & Sánchez, 1983
 Sephina pubera (Erichson, 1848)
 Sephina pustulata (Fabricius, 1803)
 Sephina quintanarooana Brailovsky, 1987
 Sephina rogersi Distant, 1881
 Sephina subulata Brailovsky & Sánchez, 1983
 Sephina sulcaticollis Schmidt, 1907
 Sephina talamancana Brailovsky, 2001
 Sephina vinula Stål, 1862

References

Further reading

External links

 

Articles created by Qbugbot
Coreidae genera
Spartocerini